Karel Electronics is a Turkish electronics manufacturer.

History

Karel has been producing telecommunications equipment, predominantly PBX telephone systems, in Turkey since 1986, going on to export as well as supply the domestic market. Karel does not produce under license from other manufacturers in Turkey or elsewhere but designs its own products in the company's R&D facility in Bilkent, Ankara. Production facilities are also in Ankara and the company HQ is in Istanbul.

References

Turkish companies established in 1986
Manufacturing companies based in Ankara